Newport, historically known as Ballyveaghan and for many years also known as Newport-Pratt, is a small town in the barony of Burrishoole, County Mayo, Ireland. The population was 626 in 2016. It is located on the west coast of Ireland, along the shore of Clew Bay, north of Westport.  The N59 road passes through the town.  The county town of Castlebar is approx 18 km east of Newport.  The Black Oak River flows through the centre of the town and there are walking paths along its banks.

Transport

Bus
Bus Éireann route 440, via Westport and Ireland West Airport Knock, operates once a day in each direction. On Sundays route 440 does not operate however Expressway route 52 provides an evening journey each way to/from Westport and Galway.

Rail access
The nearest train station is Westport railway station, approximately 14 km south.

History
Newport was established in the early 18th century by the Medlycott family. James Moore, working for the Medlycott Estate, designed the quay at Newport in a formal layout. The Medlycott family's land agent was a Captain Pratt. Pratt introduced linen manufacturing to the town under the management of immigrant Quakers who relocated to County Mayo from Ulster. It would appear that, although the immigrant Quakers found living conditions in Mayo difficult, the linen industry picked up in the mid-18th century and for the next forty years or so the town prospered around the industry. By the early 19th century it again fell into decline, and it was superseded as a port by the town of Westport seven miles to the south.  At the end of the 18th century, the Medlycott Estate was taken over by the O'Donel family who built Newport House, now a hotel, overlooking the harbour.

Quakers in Newport
In 1719 a community of Quakers came to Newport under a Captain Pratt who established a colony of linen weavers in the town which was known as Ballyvaughan at that time.  Quakers, due to their reputation of being honest and hard-working tenants, were sought after by the landlords of estates at the time.  Quaker communities usually prospered wherever they went, but the Quakers in Newport were reported to be in poor circumstances, and they needed support and help from other Quakers across Ireland and further afield from whom they were now far removed geographically by their remote location.  The nearest community of Quakers was based in Ballymurray, County Roscommon.

The Newport Quakers appear to have had no meeting house, instead meeting for religious worship in each other's homes.  With many deaths of their young people occurring within the community in the years after resettling in Mayo, a burial ground had to be established for them in the town.  The linen business interests fell on hard times and life was a struggle with constant assistance having to be brought to Newport by visiting Quakers.  By 1736 the Newport Quakers started to think about moving from their settlement.  They were unable to find suitable marriage partners from within their own community as they were all closely related and this caused them concern. The Newport Quaker community struggled on for a few more years and eventually bought some land in Roscommon where they would be closer to the Quaker community at Ballymurray.  During the winter of 1739/1740 the last of the Newport Quakers left their Newport land and homes and moved to County Roscommon where their lives would be less wretched.  Some Quakers went to America to make new lives for themselves in the years that followed.

Convent of Mercy
The O'Donel family, who took over from the Medlycotts, were Protestant. However, George O'Donel's wife was a Catholic and he donated three acres of land on Barrack Hill to the Sisters of Mercy to build a convent in Newport. It was noted that when the foundations were being dug out for the new convent in 1884, many coins and buttons were unearthed, the buttons bearing the inscription of "Pratt".  In 1887 the convent was completed and St. Joseph's Convent National School opened with a roll of 211 girls and 34 boys.  The school was a success and numbers continued to grow. The nuns were a popular addition to Newport and local merchants donated gifts to the convent. In 1894, a lace school to train girls in the lacemaking industry opened and provided some industry - until the lace market collapsed after World War II. Due to rationalisation, the sisters vacated the convent in 1977 and took up residence in a rented building in the town.  The convent managed Newport secondary school which opened in September 1956. However following the introduction of free education and free transport for second level pupils in the late sixties, the secondary school which had always experienced some difficulties in attracting a sufficiently large number of pupils was finally closed in June 1969. Since 1969 then, Newport pupils again travel to secondary schools in Westport.

Irish War of Independence 
In May 1921, the town's coach-building factory - Kilroy Bros - was burnt by the IRA.

Places of interest
Newport has a disused railway viaduct crossing the river which, together with the Catholic church on top of the hill, dominate the town.  St. Patrick's Church was built in 1914 in the Irish Romanesque Revival style by Rudolph M. Butler. It has a stained glass east window of the Last Judgment, the last window completed by Harry Clarke in 1930.  Burrishoole Friary and Grace O'Malley's Rockfleet Castle are both just to the west of the town.  The town is an angling and tourist centre with two main hotels, Newport House (opened during the summer) and Hotel Newport (opened all year round) which are conveniently located on main street and the track of the Greenway.

The Kelly homestead, the ancestral home of the actress Grace Kelly, the Princess consort of Monaco, is situated off the main road from Newport to Castlebar near the Leg of Mutton Lake. It was visited by Princess Grace and her husband Prince Rainier during their 1961 state visit to Ireland. Grace bought the property in 1979.

Gallery

See also
List of towns and villages in Ireland
Nevin (surname)

References

Towns and villages in County Mayo
Populated places established in the 18th century